The Cambridgeshire and Huntingdonshire Women's cricket team was the women's representative cricket team for the English historic counties of Cambridgeshire and Huntingdonshire. They played their home games at various grounds across the counties. They competed in the Women's County Championship between 2009 and 2019, and competed in the Women's Twenty20 Cup until 2014. After 2014 the two counties competed separately in the Twenty20 Cup, as Cambridgeshire Women and Huntingdonshire Women, and, with the discontinuation of the Women's County Championship after the 2019 season, Cambridgeshire and Huntingdonshire no longer compete as a unified team.

History
Cambridgeshire and Huntingdonshire Women joined the Women's Twenty20 Cup in 2009 and the Women's County Championship in 2010. In their first season in the County Championship, they were promoted from Division 5E, winning five out of six games. After being relegated in 2012, they remained in the bottom tier of the competition until the final season of the Championship in 2019. They were also promoted in the Twenty20 Cup in 2010 Women's Twenty20 Cup, but were relegated the following season. In 2014, Cambridgeshire and Huntingdonshire split into Cambridgeshire Women and Huntingdonshire Women for the Twenty20 competition. Cambridgeshire have competed in every season since then, whilst Huntingdonshire competed in 2014 and returned in 2021.

Seasons

Women's County Championship

Women's Twenty20 Cup

See also
 Cambridgeshire County Cricket Club
 Cambridgeshire Women cricket team
 Huntingdonshire County Cricket Club
 Huntingdonshire Women cricket team

References

Cricket in Cambridgeshire
Cricket in Huntingdonshire
Women's cricket teams in England